"Siphonaptera" is a name used to refer to the following rhyme by Augustus De Morgan (Siphonaptera being the biological order to which fleas belong):

The rhyme appears in De Morgan's A Budget of Paradoxes (1872) along with a discussion of the possibility that all particles may be made up of clusters of smaller particles, 'and so down, for ever'; and similarly that planets and stars may be particles of some larger universe, 'and so up, for ever'.

The lines derive from part of Jonathan Swift's long satirical poem "On Poetry: A Rapsody" of 1733:

Lewis F. Richardson adapted the poem to meteorology in 1922:

See also
Self-similarity
Turtles all the way down

References

English poems
Fiction about insects
Fleas
Humorous poems
1872 poems